Raymond Kelly (January 24, 1914  in Philadelphia, Pennsylvania United States – November 22, 1988 in Philadelphia) was a sportswriter who worked 50 years for the Philadelphia Bulletin. He covered the Philadelphia Athletics from 1948 to 1955 and the Philadelphia Phillies from 1956 until he retired in 1979.

A president of both the Philadelphia and national chapters of the Baseball Writers' Association of America, Kelly was a posthumous recipient of the J. G. Taylor Spink Award at the 1989 induction ceremonies at the National Baseball Hall of Fame in Cooperstown, New York. The Philadelphia Old Timers' Soccer Association inducted Kelly into its Hall of Fame in 1985.

He died at age 74 at Nazareth Hospital in Philadelphia and was cremated.

External links
Baseball Hall of Fame - Spink Award recipient

Sportswriters from Pennsylvania
Baseball writers
1914 births
1988 deaths
BBWAA Career Excellence Award recipients
20th-century American non-fiction writers